River Fleet (Flota Rzeczna)

Pinsk Fleet

River Monitors

Warszawa (Warsaw), Horodyszcze, Pińsk, Toruń
built in 1920 (Stocznia Gdańska), displacement 110/126,5t
 since 1920 – 105 mm Cannons (2xI), 5 MG
 since 1920s – 100 mm howitzer (1xI), 75 mm Cannons (2xI), 4 MG
 since 1930s – 75 mm Guns (1xII and 1xI), 2 MG

Kraków, Wilno
 100 mm wz 1914/19P howitzers (x3)
 7.92 mm Maxim MG (x3)
 since 1939: 13.2mm Hotchkiss AAMG (x2)

Gunboats

Zuchwała, Zawzięta, Zaradna
 100 mm wz.14/19 Cannon (x1)
 37 mm Puteaux Cannon (x1)
 7.92 mm Hotchkiss MG (x1)

Motor boats/Cutters

KU-1

KU-7

KU-8

KU-9

KU-14, KU-15

LKU 16, 17, 18, 19
 37 mm Puteaux Cannon (x1)
 7.9 mm Maxim 08 Heavy MG (x1)

KU 21, 22, 23, 24
 37 mm Puteaux Cannon (x1)
 7.9 mm Maxim 08 Heavy MG (x1)

LKU 25, 26, 27, 28, 29
 37 mm
 7.9 mm MG

Vistula Fleet

Motor boats/Cutters

CKU Nieuchwytny
 40 mm Bofors Antiaircraft Cannon   
 37 mm Puteaux Cannon
 7.9 mm Hotchkiss Heavy MG

KU 30
 13.2 mm Hotchkiss 03 Heavy MG (1×2)

KU-4

KU-6
 37 mm Cannon

KM 12, 13

See also

 Polish Navy
 Order of Battle of the Riverine Flotilla of the Polish Navy
 Riverine Flotilla of the Polish Navy

World War II military equipment of Poland
World War II weapons of Poland
Polish Navy
Riverine warfare